Orm Finnendahl (born in 1963) is a German composer.

Life 
Born in Düsseldorf, von 1983 bis 1990 Finnendahl studied music composition and musicology with Frank Michael Beyer, Carl Dahlhaus and Gösta Neuwirth in Berlin. He then studied from 1995 to 1998 with Helmut Lachenmann at the State University of Music and Performing Arts Stuttgart. From 1988 to 1989 he studied at the California Institute of the Arts in Los Angeles.

He was director of the Kreuzberg sound workshop from 1991 to 1995. He taught at the Electronic Studio of the Technische Universität Berlin and headed the Institute for New Music at the Universität der Künste Berlin from 1996 to 2001. In 2004 he became professor for composition at the Hochschule für Musik Freiburg. There he ran the studio for electronic music. Since 2013 Finnendahl has been professor of composition at the Hochschule für Musik und Darstellende Kunst Frankfurt am Main.

Honours 
 1997: Kompositionspreis der Landeshauptstadt Stuttgart
 1999:  of the Academy of Arts, Berlin
 2001: Prix Ars Electronica
 2001: Preisträger CYNETART-Festival in Dresden

References

External links 
 Orm Finnendahl at the Folkwang-Hochschule
 Orm Finnendahl on Webarchiv
 

German composers
20th-century classical composers
Academic staff of the Berlin University of the Arts
Academic staff of the Hochschule für Musik Freiburg
1963 births
Living people
Musicians from Düsseldorf